The American Girls is an American adventure-drama series that aired on CBS on Saturday nights from September 23 to November 11, 1978.

Synopsis
Rebecca Tomkins (Barnes) and Amy Waddell (Clinger) are two young reporters who work for The American Report, a news magazine similar to 60 Minutes. Rebecca and Amy travel the country in an equipped van that provides them with a production studio to work on their stories. The show's producer, Francis X. Casey (Spielberg), is busy juggling assignments, often changing the girls' schedules in mid-assignment and sometimes flying out to help them out of a tough situation.

Cast
Priscilla Barnes as Rebecca Tomkins
Debra Clinger as Amy Waddell
David Spielberg as Francis X. Casey
William Prince as Jason Cook

Episodes

References

External links 
   

1978 American television series debuts
1978 American television series endings
CBS original programming
1970s American drama television series
Television series about television
Television series about journalism
Television series by Sony Pictures Television
Television shows set in Kentucky